was a heavy cruiser of the Imperial Japanese Navy.  The second vessel in the four-ship , she was laid down in 1931 and commissioned in 1935.  During World War II she participated in the Battle of Sunda Strait in February 1942 and the Battle of Midway in June 1942, being sunk the last day of the latter engagement, on 6 June.

The ship was named after the Mikuma river in Oita prefecture, Japan.

Background
Built under the 1931 Fleet Replenishment Program, the Mogami-class cruisers were designed to the maximum limits allowed by the Washington Naval Treaty, using the latest technology. This resulted in the choice of a 155 mm dual purpose (DP) main battery in five triple turrets capable of 55° elevation. To save weight, electric welding was used, as was aluminum in the superstructure, and the use of a single funnel stack. New impulse geared turbine engines, coupled with very heavy anti-aircraft protection, gave the class a very high speed and protection. However, the Mogami class was also plagued with technical problems due to its untested equipment and proved to be unstable and top-heavy as well, due to cramming too much equipment into a comparatively small hull.

Service career

Early career

Mikuma was completed at Mitsubishi's Nagasaki shipyards on 29 August 1935.

Beginning in 1939, Mikuma was brought in for substantial reconstruction, replacing the triple  turrets with twin  guns (the 155 mm turrets going to the battleship ). Torpedo bulges were also added to improve stability, but the increased displacement caused a reduction in speed.

Mikuma participated in the occupation of Cochinchina, French Indochina, after Japan and Vichy French authorities reached an understanding on use of its air facilities and harbors from July 1941, from its forward operating base on Hainan. At the time of the attack on Pearl Harbor, Mikuma was assigned to cover the invasion of Malaya as part of Cruiser Division 7 under Vice Admiral Jisaburo Ozawa's First Southern Expeditionary Fleet, providing close support for landings of Japanese troops at Singora, Pattani and Kota Bharu.

In February 1942, Mikuma was tasked with covering landings of Japanese troops in Sumatra and Java.

Battle of Sunda Strait
At 2355, Houston scored hits on Mikuma that knocked out her electrical power, but it was quickly restored. During the battle, Mikuma lost six men and eleven others were wounded. Both Houston and Perth were sunk during the engagement, as was transport Ryujo Maru with IJA 16th Army commander Lieutenant General Hitoshi Imamura—although the general survived the sinking.

In March, Mikuma and Cruiser Division 7 were based at Singapore to cover Japanese landings in Sumatra and the seizure of the Andaman Islands.

From 1 April 1942 Cruiser Division 7 based from Mergui joined with Cruiser Division 4 to participate in the Indian Ocean raids. During the operation, the Southern Group claimed kills on 7,726-ton British passenger ship Dardanus and 5,281-ton British steamship Ganara and the 6,622-ton British merchant vessel Indora, en route from Calcutta to Mauritius.

On 22 April, Cruiser Division 7 returned to Kure, and Mikuma went into dry dock for overhaul. On 26 May, Cruiser Division 7 arrived at Guam to provide close support for Rear Admiral Raizo Tanaka's Midway Invasion Transport Group. Mikumas crew was advised that upon the completion of the Midway operation they would proceed to the Aleutian Islands and from there to Australia.

Battle of Midway
On  5 June, Admiral Isoroku Yamamoto, CINC of the Combined Fleet ordered Cruiser Division 7 to shell Midway in preparation for a Japanese landing. The Mikuma at the time was captained by Captain Sakiyama Shakao, former skipper of the cruiser . The sea was choppy and the destroyers lagged behind. This placed Cruiser Division 7 within range of the submarine , which was spotted by the cruiser . Kumano signalled a submarine alert to the formation and directed the ships to conduct evasive maneuvers to the left. The squadron was thrown into confusion. Kumano turned sharply to port for a short time, heading west, before turning slightly starboard back to north. Suzuya followed her but coursed slightly less to port. She found herself steaming directly for Kumano but turned sharply to starboard and narrowly avoided colliding with the Kumano. Mikuma attempted to mirror the movements of Suzuya, turning to port and then turning to port further more after witnessing Suzuya maneuvering to avoid the formation's flagship (to avoid being entangled with the flagship). Mogami at the rear of the formation had made a turn to port and maintained a straight course heading north-west. Mikumas final turn to port had brought her directly into the course of Mogami. In the darkness, Mogami did not sight Mikuma until she was very close to Mogami, moving ahead across her starboard bow. Captain Soji of Mogami attempted a last-second sharp turn to port, but it was too late. This resulted in a collision in which Mogami rammed Mikumas portside, below the bridge. Mogamis bow caved in and she was badly damaged. Mikumas portside oil tanks ruptured and she began to spill oil, but otherwise her damage was slight, thanks in part to the last-second portside turn that deflected Mogamis bow along an angle from Mikumas portside. With her damaged bow, Mogami could make only  for the time being, and was generally unwieldy and clumsy. At 0630, a PBY Catalina spotted the stragglers, thanks to the massive oil trail leaking from Mikuma, and radioed their coordinates to Admiral Spruance. Throughout the day, in an aura of great confusion, many American sighting reports would misidentify one of the two ships as a battleship. Other sightings of the flagship of CruDiv 7 steaming at high speed to the north-west, combined with the reports of battleships and suspicions of a fifth carrier lurking about, led to great consternation on the part of Spruance and his staff at Task force 16, who thought that the faster force steaming northwest was the one that contained the battleship. Midway wasted no time after receiving the report and launched the remnants of VMSB-241 containing 12 dive bombers (6 SBD Dauntlesses and 6 SB2Us divided in two wings). The aircraft travelled the short distance of 40 miles to their target and found the two cruisers. Despite her damaged bow and greatly reduced speed, Mogami began evasive maneuvers along with Mikuma and received no hits from the Dauntless section. Capt. Richard Fleming, in command of the Vindicator section, led his bombers in a glide bombing attack. The two cruisers responded with accurate and effective anti-aircraft fire, and managed to shoot down Fleming's bomber. Almost as soon as this attack ended, a group of eight B-17 level bombers operating out of Midway, led by Lt. Col. Brooke E. Allen, arrived to attack the two cruisers. They attacked in two sections of four aircraft and dropped a total of 39 bombs around the two ships with no hits. This attack concluded at around 0830.

The following morning, 6 June 1942, Mikuma and Mogami were still heading due west instead of north-west where the combined fleet was converging, hoping to come within the  range of Wake Island's fighter air cover. Hornets 26 dive bombers arrived first, and at first ignored the two cruisers and searched for the alleged battleship ahead of this force, but having found nothing they circled back to the two cruisers and commenced their attacks. All bombing attempts on Mikuma missed, but two bombs struck Mogami, hitting one of her 8-inch turrets and the aircraft deck, respectively. The latter bomb could have caused fatal damage to the Mogami as it started a fire in the torpedo room below the aviation facility, but Mogamis damage control officer had previously ordered all torpedoes jettisoned. Anti-aircraft fire from the force shot down two of Hornets SBD Dauntlesses. At 1045 a composite force of 31 dive bombers launched from Enterprise to seek the purported battleship in the area spotted the two stragglers. The force was escorted by 12 Wildcats and 3 TBM Devastator torpedo bombers. The force was under the command of Wallace "Wally" Short of Yorktown (some of her aircraft had been forced to land at Task Force 16 after their ship was abandoned). The dive bombers once again bypassed CruDiv 7 to search for the battleship, which was not located. The Wildcats escorting the formations approached the cruisers and received anti-aircraft fire that forced them to retreat to a safe distance. The Wildcat formation leader radioed to the dive bombers that one of the ships appeared to be a battleship (perhaps owing to the contrast between the two cruisers presented by Mogamis shattered bow) and the dive bomber formation reversed course to attack the formation. Willy Short, leading the dive bombers, wanted to circle behind the formation and attack with the sun behind them, as was a favored dive bombing practice. But his rear section of the formation, VB-3, detached itself and attacked the rearmost cruiser in the formation (Mogami), planting 2 bombs in her at 1230. Cascading through a fiery torrent of her anti-aircraft fire, the bombers delivered two hits. The first struck her No.3 turret; the explosion killed many of the officers on the bridge, including the commander of the starboard anti-aircraft batteries, and injured her captain severely enough to render him unconscious. Mikumas executive officer Takashima Hideo took command of the cruiser. The second bomb crashed through the deck and disabled the starboard forward engine rooms. Immediately after, two more bombs hit her aviation deck and exploded in the port aft engine room, starting a fire near her torpedo room. Mikuma was now dead in the water. The attacking planes left (the three TBM Devastator torpedo bombers did not join the attack, having being instructed to not attack anything that could respond with anti-aircraft fire). At 1358, the fire amidships Mikuma reached the torpedoes stored there and triggered a chain of massive secondary explosions, putting to rest the hope of towing the ship out of danger. At 1420 Mogami radioed to the combined fleet that Mikuma was in dire straits. The secondary explosions left Mikumas aft-amidships section and the aviation facility unrecognizable. The mast and superstructure atop the bridge collapsed and crashed into the conflagration in the aviation compartment. Though it wasn't obvious at the time, the bomb hit on the port machinery spaces had also ruptured the ship below the waterline, and she began taking on water. Mikuma continued trying to bring her fires under control, but approximately 30 minutes later the ship's executive officer Takashima came to the conclusion that there was no hope of saving the ship now that she was slowly settling in the water and gave the order to abandon ship. Takashima ordered the repair parties to throw shoring wood and other materials overboard to construct life rafts. Mogami and Arashio were close to Mikuma but maintained a safe distance as Mikuma was still burning and exploding, so the crews of Mikuma would have to swim over to the ships or use life rafts and launchers to reach Arashio and Mogami. In the meanwhile Asashio patrolled in a circle around them to screen the ships from air or submarine attack. The ship's severely wounded captain Sakiyama was lowered on the first life raft, closely followed by the ship's paymaster and air officers, who took with them the ship's important documents. The rafts were launched towards the direction of Arashio. Takashima remained in the ship's smoke-filled bridge, choosing to go down with the ship. The ship's main battery fire control director commander, Lt. Koyama Masao, also refused to leave the ship, choosing to instead commit Hara-Kiri on top of the forward gun turret, ashamed that his guns did not have a chance to smash the enemy. 

A few minutes after Takashima gave the order to abandon ship, the ships were set upon by yet another dive bombing attack. At 1445, 23 Dauntlesses from Hornet that had been launched at 1330 arrived over the hapless formation. Arashio and Mogami immediately commenced evasive maneuvers, leaving behind them many of Mikumas crew in the water who were still making their way to their accompanying ships. The dive bombers commenced their attack at 1500. Mogami and Arashio did not have enough time to get underway and were both hit. The burning Mikuma was also hit. Arashio was hit by a bomb, which tragically exploded among the surviving crew of Mikuma that she had just picked up out of the water, killing 37 men outright and damaging her steering ability badly enough to force the destroyer to switch to manual steering and wounding Cdr. Ogawa Nobuki, commander of DesDiv8. Mogami received a hit near the seaplane deck, which started a fire near the sick bay and killed almost all of the ship's doctors and their orderlies outright. The fire was quickly contained at the cost of the life of most of the injured and wounded men in the sick bay. Asashio was not hit by the bombing attack but lost 22 men to strafing. Realizing the urgency of the situation, Captain Akira Soji, then in command of the detachment, communicated to the Combined Fleet to inform them of the attack, and immediately set course west to vacate the area before more air attacks occurred, leaving most of Mikumas crew in the water, Mogami and the two destroyers of DesDiv8 sailed away from her, having had time to rescue only 239 of her crew, including her dying captain Sakiyama. Mikuma continued to drift and burn for at least 4 more hours. Owing to the great confusion among American sighting report the past 2 days, Admrial Spruance of Task Force 16 ordered two recon Dauntlesses with cameras launched from Enterprise at 1553 to ascertain whether this damaged ship was indeed the alleged battleship reported by multiple reconnaissance airplanes. The Dauntlesses arrived over the burning Mikuma at 1715, just before dusk, and took several photographs of her at extremely low altitude, and recorded footage of her as well. The Dauntlesses recorded her position at 29°-28'N, 173°-11'E before leaving her. She was the first Japanese cruiser to be sunk during the war. Only 188 of Mikumas crew survived the ordeal; her captain also succumbed 3 days later to his wounds while he was aboard Suzuya. Captain Soji later ordered Asashio to reverse course and go back to Mikuma and make every effort to save any of her surviving crews. Asashio made her way back to Mikumas location but found nothing, and promptly returned to CruDiv7, according to her log she found nothing but a great patch of oil and "not one survivor could be rescued".

Owing to the secrecy and attempted cover-up of the disaster at Midway, the General Navy Headquarters would list Mikuma as "heavily damaged" rather than sunk, and then temporarily listed her as "unmanned" before being struck off the navy list at 10 August 1942.

References

Bibliography

Further reading

External links
 
Tabular record:   CombinedFleet.com: Mikuma history (Retrieved 26 January 2007.)
Gallery: US Navy Historical Center 

Mogami-class cruisers
Ships built by Mitsubishi Heavy Industries
1934 ships
World War II cruisers of Japan
World War II shipwrecks in the Pacific Ocean
Cruisers sunk by aircraft
Maritime incidents in June 1942
Ships sunk by US aircraft